Al Mustafa Riyadh (born August 5, 1975) is a Bahraini marathon runner of Moroccan origin. Riyadh represented Bahrain at the 2008 Summer Olympics in Beijing, where he competed for the men's marathon, along with his compatriots Abdulhak Zakaria, and Nasar Sakar Saeed. Unfortunately, he was unable to finish the entire race for the second time since he did the same fate at the 2004 Summer Olympics in Athens.

Riyadh also achieved his personal best time of 2:11:41, by winning the bronze medal at the 2008 Düsseldorf Marathon.

References

External links

NBC Olympics Profile
 
 

1975 births
Living people
Moroccan male long-distance runners
Bahraini male long-distance runners
Moroccan male marathon runners
Bahraini male marathon runners
Olympic athletes of Bahrain
Athletes (track and field) at the 2004 Summer Olympics
Athletes (track and field) at the 2008 Summer Olympics
Naturalized citizens of Bahrain
Bahraini people of Moroccan descent
Moroccan emigrants to Bahrain